First Lieutenant James Isaac Christiancy (1844 to December 18, 1899) was an American soldier who fought in the American Civil War. Christiancy received the country's highest award for bravery during combat, the Medal of Honor, for his action at Hawes Shops, Virginia on 28 May 1864. He was honored with the award on 10 October 1892.

Biography
Christiancy was born in Monroe County, Michigan in 1844. He enlisted into the 9th Michigan Cavalry. He died on 18 December 1899 and his remains are interred at the Arlington National Cemetery in Virginia.

Medal of Honor citation

See also

List of American Civil War Medal of Honor recipients: A–F

References

1844 births
1899 deaths
People of Michigan in the American Civil War
Union Army officers
United States Army Medal of Honor recipients
American Civil War recipients of the Medal of Honor